Fictional actuaries and the appearance of actuaries in works of fiction have been the subject of a number of articles in actuarial journals.

Film
 The Ice Road (2021) - Varnay (played by Benjamin Walker (actor); He introduced himself as an insurance actuarial
 About Schmidt (2002) - Warren Schmidt is portrayed by Jack Nicholson; the movie mostly covers Schmidt's retirement from an insurance company, and his adventures after retirement
 Along Came Polly (2004) - Reuben Feffer (played by Ben Stiller) is a risk assessment expert, and though not explicitly stated, performs the job of an underwriter
 Are You With It? (1948) - a musical comedy featuring Donald O'Connor as an actuary who is forced to join a carnival after misplacing a decimal point on a statistical table
 The Billion Dollar Bubble (1976) - the Equity Funding scandal retold in the form of a movie, starring James Woods
 Boyhood (2014) - Mason Evans, Sr. (played by Ethan Hawke) mentions at a baseball game that he recently passed his second actuarial exam, and later discusses his job at an insurance firm
 Class Action (1991) - featured Gene Hackman and Mary Elizabeth Mastrantonio as father and daughter lawyers on opposite sides of a massive class action lawsuit; actuarial analysis plays a key role in the outcome
 Double Indemnity (1944) - a Billy Wilder film, with Fred MacMurray and Barbara Stanwyck; possibly the first to feature an actuary; the plot revolves around a murder that seeks to gain advantage from a particular aspect of an insurance policy; an insurance investigator (played by Edward G. Robinson) knows the actuarial statistics and becomes suspicious
 Escape Clause (1996) - Andrew McCarthy plays Richard Ramsay in an actuarial thriller; to quote TVguide.com, "The makers of this direct-to-video release thought the world was ready for a thriller about an insurance actuary. They thought wrong."
 Fight Club (1999) - Edward Norton plays the protagonist, who briefly describes that his job entails the assessment of risk associated with car accidents for an insurance company; though not explicitly stated, he performs the job of an underwriter who uses actuarially derived premiums to benchmark quotes
 Groundhog Day (1993) - Bill Murray's character Phil Connors is pestered daily by talkative insurance salesman Ned, who at one point insists that he has friends "who live and die by the actuarial tables." 
 It Chapter Two (2019) - James Ransone plays the adult version of Eddie Kaspbrak, who explains during the Losers Club's reunion dinner that he works as a risk analyst in New York. (In the novel and 1990 miniseries versions of the story, Eddie instead owns a limo company.)
 Saw VI (2009) - William Easton is a health insurance executive who describes actuarial mathematics in a conversation with John Kramer
 Stranger than Fiction (2006) - Harold Crick (played by Will Ferrell), a socially isolated IRS auditor, mentions that he was once engaged to an auditor who left him for an actuary
 Sweet Charity (1969) - documents the romantic life of an actuary, played by John McMartin with Shirley MacLaine as his love interest
 Thirteen Conversations About One Thing (2001) - starring Matthew McConaughey; the lives of a lawyer, an actuary, a housecleaner, a professor, and the people around them intersect as they ponder order and happiness in the face of life's cold unpredictability
 Tron - the character Ram (played by Dan Shor) is an actuarial program
 Zootopia (also released as Zootropolis) (2016) - the character Jaguar is a young tiger that aspires to be an actuary.
  Hellboy (2019) - the character Major Ben Daimio played by Daniel Dae Kim, states that he was once an actuary; and used to assess risk based on a series of complex mathematical equations

Literature
The Areas of My Expertise - by John Hodgman; portrays actuaries as prophets who predict the future, and are organized into various guilds; they have various ethics, such as not predicting the date of one's own death
 Batman - comic series which featured a villain named the Actuary (Detective Comics #683-4 (March–April 1995)), a mathematical genius who applies formulae to aid the Penguin in committing crimes.
 Bet Me - by Jennifer Crusie; the main character, Minerva Dobbs, is a thirty-something actuary looking for love
Un Certain Monsieur Blot - by Pierre Daninos; Mr. Blot is an actuary, who wins a competition as the most average man in France; the book includes the acerbic observation that “there were two kinds of actuaries – those who were still doing actuarial work and those who had found something better to do”
The Colour of Magic and The Light Fantastic are part of Terry Pratchett’s Discworld fantasy series and feature Twoflower, the "actuary and world’s first tourist"
The Foundation Trilogy - by Isaac Asimov; often considered one of the greatest science fiction works of all time and features "psycho-historians," a sort of hidden priesthood that manipulates politics and economics on a galactic scale to accomplish the goals of peace and prosperity. Part of the theory is that on a planetary scale, people are not predictable but on a galactic scale, the law of large numbers (i.e., the Central Limit Theorem) is valid and therefore, the reactions of the galactic civilization, as a whole, are predictable. Given the characteristics of psycho-historians, they are very much like actuaries.
 The Good Soldier Švejk - Lieutenant Pelikán is "a mathematician in an insurance firm"
"Hunted Down" - short story by Charles Dickens with an actuary, Mr. Meltham of the Inestimable Life Assurance Company, as its hero
 Industrial Magic - by Kelley Armstrong; character Reuben Aldrich is the head of the actuarial department at a supernatural organisation; he may also be a necromancer
Mrs. Warren's Profession - "I shall set up in chambers in the City and work at actuarial calculations and conveyancing," says Vivie, the daughter of the eponymous heroine of George Bernard Shaw’s play
 Preferred Risk - by Frederik Pohl and Lester del Rey (under the pseudonym Edson McCann); describes a dystopian future dominated by the insurance industry; in Pohl's own words, "the one novel I wrote with Lester del Rey, which was called Preferred Risk, took a year out of my life. It's a terrible book. If you come across it, don't read it."
 The Rabbit Factor - by Antti Tuomainen;  describes the actuary Henri Kosinen who inherits an adventure park. A humorous crime fiction novel.  
 The Year of the Jackpot - short story by Robert A. Heinlein; the male protagonist is a former actuary whose analysis of current events leads him to a disturbing conclusion about the fate of the world.

Manga
Homunculus -  by Hideo Yamamoto; features Susumu Nakoshi as the story's protagonist, who was an actuary before he told people he was going on an extended vacation; instead, he lives in an old car; he resigns later in the story, and his reason for throwing his job away is still unknown
Kurosagi Corpse Delivery Service - features a malevolent actuary who uses statistics to determine scenarios that will most likely result in the death of particular people

Television
 The Robinsons - sitcom about a reinsurance actuary, Ed Robinson (played by Martin Freeman), who realises that reinsurance is not his passion and decides to rethink his life
A Million Little Things - Gary works for an insurance company as an actuary
Kim Possible - Ron's dad works as an actuary as first revealed in the 2007 episode, Odds Man In

Theater
I Love You Because (2006) -  musical;  major character Diana Bingley is an actuary; she suggests some formula-based "dating rules" to her friend Marcy in the key number "The Actuary Song"

Other
 Society of Actuaries - holds a speculative actuarial fiction contest
 Wordplay - documentary which explores the world of crossword makers and aficionados; makes reference to actuaries as one of three occupations which are particularly adept at crossword solving
 Zootopia - animated Disney film in which a tiger mistakenly believes that actuaries 'hunt for tax exemptions'
 Supernatural - in season 7 episode 8 Season Seven, Time for a Wedding!, Dean Winchester claims he was writing an article for "Actuarial Insider" while investigating the suddenly promoted junior salesman to CEO of an insurance company.

References

"Charles Dickens and the Literary Actuary" - September/October 2001 issue of Contingencies, a bimonthly magazine published by the American Academy of Actuaries
Actuary Australia ("Two Ducks" column - September 2003, November 2003 April 2004, May 2004 editions)

External links

Actuarial science
 
 Actuaries, fictional